Tobias Klein (born 23 March 1982), also known as Tobi Klein, is a German former professional tennis player.

Klein, a native of Baden-Württemberg, was a collegiate player for the University of Alabama at Birmingham. 

Competing professionally from 2004, Klein's most notable achievement was qualifying for the main draw of the 2005 Ordina Open, an ATP Tour tournament in s-Hertogenbosch, Netherlands. He reached his career best singles world ranking of 591 in 2006 and won five ITF Futures titles as a doubles player.

ITF Futures titles

Doubles: (5)

References

External links
 
 

1982 births
Living people
German male tennis players
UAB Blazers athletes
College men's tennis players in the United States
Tennis people from Baden-Württemberg